Öringesjön is a lake in Stockholm County, Södermanland, Sweden. It is located on the border of Nacka Municipality and Tyresö Municipality.

Lakes of Stockholm County